Oxyphysis is a genus of dinoflagellates.

It includes the species Oxyphysis oxytoides.

References

Dinoflagellate genera